Franz Anton Maulbertsch (7 June 1724 – 8 August 1796) was an Austrian painter and engraver, one of the most renowned exponents of Rococo painting in the German and Hungarian regions.

Maulbertsch was born in Langenargen and studied in the Academy of Vienna. Through the knowledge of Paul Troger, he was influenced by the Venetian painters Piazzetta and Giovanni Battista Pittoni. He also studied the frescoes by Sebastiano Ricci in the Schönbrunn Palace in Vienna, and frequented Giambattista Tiepolo, who was active in Würzburg starting from 1750.

An appreciated frescoer, he received numerous commissions, mostly of ecclesiastical theme. He produced art for churches in Bicske, Kalocsa, Vienna's Michaelerkirche and Piaristenkirche Maria Treu. He also decorated the Porta Coeli in Moravia, the Kroměříž Archbishop's Palace and the villa of Halbturn.

He also painted a portrait of Narcissus of Jerusalem.

He died at Vienna in 1796.

Gallery

Notes

References 

1724 births
1796 deaths
18th-century Austrian painters
18th-century Austrian male artists
Austrian male painters
Austrian people of German descent
People from Bodenseekreis
Academy of Fine Arts Vienna alumni
Catholic decorative artists
Catholic painters